() is a manga series created by Osamu Tezuka dealing with the adventures of the eponymous phantom thief. Collected in seven volumes, it has been published in France by Asuka.

Plot 
Rainbow Parakeet is a genius as an actor, and a thief at the same time. As he is not a full-time , he is usually hired as a replacement. During the performance, he steals from the wealthiest members of the audience or even actors, depriving them of the contents of their purses or their jewelry. True to his alias name "Rainbow Parakeet", he can assume the role of almost any part and change into any costume, and his repertoire is immense.

His methods are a mystery, even to the detectives charged with apprehending him: Police Inspector Senri and his daughter, Police Detective Mariko Senri.

Characters 
Rainbow Parakeet
A thief who is also a professional mimic (although he called himself a layman in acting), he usually steals from the rich among the audience, causing Detective Senri and her daughter Mariko to pursue him.

Police Inspector Senri

Police Detective Mariko Senri
Inspector Senri's daughter. While she is passionate about capturing Rainbow Parakeet, she is also in love with him.

Tamasaburō
A dog who is as good at disguising himself as Parakeet. Tamasaburo soon joins Parakeet in his work.

Chochin Odawara

Mozuku Tengusa

Clown Tommy

General remarks
The work was serialized in the Weekly Shonen Champion and ran from 1981 to 1982.

Each typical episode adapted or paid homage to a play from the West, or from the Japanese theater, both traditional and modern. Examples include Ibsen (Episode 3. Doll's House) and Shakespeare (Episode 35. The dog Tamasaburō faces the threat of being fed to a lion named Shylock).

The work has been adapted into several stage plays. The 2000 adaptation starred Goro Inagaki as Rainbow Parakeet and Rie Miyazawa as Mariko.

Appearances in other media

Astro Boy (1980 TV series)
Parakeet appeared as detective "Sherlock Homespun" in an episode of the 1980s series, where he was an English cyborg private detective who helps Astro Boy recover an artificial sun created to help exploration in Pluto.

Astro Boy (2003 TV series) 
Parakeet is featured in several episodes of the 2003 TV incarnation of Astro Boy as the terrorist Kato.

See also 
 List of Osamu Tezuka manga
 Osamu Tezuka's Star System

References

External links 
 Rainbow Parakeet in the Tezuka World database
 

Akita Shoten manga
Crime in anime and manga
Musicals based on anime and manga
Osamu Tezuka characters
Osamu Tezuka manga
Shōnen manga
Theatre in anime and manga